Charles B. Lewis was an American football coach.  He served as the head football coach at Allegheny College in Meadville, Pennsylvania, during the 1906 season.  His coaching record at Allegheny was 2–7.

References

Year of birth missing
Year of death missing
Allegheny Gators football coaches
Amherst College alumni